Penny Century is the debut album of Swedish indie rock group the Bear Quartet. It was released in 1992 on the record label A West Side Fabrication.

Track listing 
"The Juiceman"
"Headacher"
"20"
"Hrnn Hrnn"
"Spoon"
"Bob"
"Private Sue"
"Dead Speedy"
"Tenderversion"
"Elvis Beach"
"I Got the Door"
"Sandi Morning"
"Broke"

Sources 
 Penny Century – The Bear Quartet Fan Pages

The Bear Quartet albums
1992 debut albums